Kizlyarsky District is an administrative and municipal district (raion), one of the forty-one in the Republic of Dagestan, Russia. It is located in the north of the republic. Its administrative center is the town of Kizlyar (which is not administratively a part of the district). As of the 2010 Census, the total population of the district was 67,287.

Administrative and municipal status
Within the framework of administrative divisions, Kizlyarsky District is one of the forty-one in the republic. It is divided into nineteen selsoviets, comprising eighty-four rural localities. The town of Kizlyar serves as its administrative center, despite being incorporated separately as an administrative unit with the status equal to that of the districts.

As a municipal division, the district is incorporated as Kizlyarsky Municipal District. Its nineteen selsoviets are incorporated as twenty-two rural settlements within the municipal district. The Town of Kizlyar is incorporated separately from the district as Kizlyar Urban Okrug, but serves as the administrative center of the municipal district as well.

References

Notes

Sources

Districts of Dagestan
